Oxyphenisatine (or oxyphenisatin) is a laxative.   It is closely related to bisacodyl, sodium picosulfate, and phenolphthalein. Long-term use is associated with liver damage, and as a result, it was withdrawn in most countries in the early 1970s.  The acetate derivative oxyphenisatine acetate was also once used as a laxative.

Natural chemical compounds similar to oxyphenisatine may be present in prunes, but a recent review of the relevant scientific literature suggests that the laxative effect of prunes is due to other constituents including phenolic compounds (mainly neochlorogenic acids and chlorogenic acids) and sorbitol.

Synthesis 
The ketone group of isatin (1) is nonenolizable and has interesting properties. In strong acid it becomes protonated, and the oxygen can be replaced by electron rich moieties.

In 1885, it was reported that condensation of isatin with phenol 2 leads to 3, which is Acetylated to (4). Oxyphenisatin has cathartic properties.

Triacetyldiphenolisatin (Laxagetten, Unilax, Trisatin), Nicoxyphenisatin & Cinnoxyphenisatin are chemical derivatives.

References 

 
Hepatotoxins
Lactams
Indolines
2,2-Bis(4-hydroxyphenyl)propanes